Romaro Miller (born September 12, 1978) is a former American football quarterback from Shannon, Mississippi.  He is best known as a three-year starter for the University of Mississippi Rebels.  He also played in the NFL and CFL professionally.

College
Miller set many records at Ole Miss but had the misfortune of being immediately followed by Eli Manning, who would go on to have an outstanding career for the Rebels and break several of Miller's recently set records. As an Ole Miss Rebel he completed 497 passes on 902 tries. He had 6,311 passing yards and 43 touchdowns. He led Ole Miss to three straight bowl games winning the Independence Bowl twice and losing the Music City Bowl.  His overall record at Ole Miss was 22-13.

Professional
Miller played three seasons in the National Football League for the Minnesota Vikings, primarily backing up Daunte Culpepper.  He then went to the Canadian Football League where he played for the Ottawa Renegades, the Calgary Stampeders, and the Toronto Argonauts.  As the Argonauts' third-string quarterback, he was a member of their 2004 team that won the 92nd Grey Cup.  Miller also played for the Rhein Fire of NFL Europa.

Miller was the quarterbacks coach at Millsaps College following his NFL career.

References

1978 births
Living people
People from DeSoto County, Mississippi
People from Lee County, Mississippi
Players of American football from Mississippi
American football quarterbacks
Ole Miss Rebels football players
Minnesota Vikings players
Rhein Fire players
American players of Canadian football
Canadian football quarterbacks
Ottawa Renegades players
Toronto Argonauts players